Sterkenburg is a hamlet and former municipality in the Dutch province of Utrecht. It existed between 1818 and 1857, when it was merged with Driebergen.

The  is located here, about 3 km south of Driebergen. The literal translation of the name is "strong castle".

There is also a Dutch surname "Sterkenburg", which is derived from this location.

References

External links

Former municipalities of Utrecht (province)
Populated places in Utrecht (province)
Utrechtse Heuvelrug